Under 23 is a category of athletics in which athletes compete under from 20 to 22 years on 31 December of the year of the competition.

Championships
European Athletics U23 Championships, organized by the EAA every 2 years
NACAC Under-23 Championships in Athletics
South American Under-23 Championships in Athletics

See also
List of world under-23 bests in athletics

Under-18 athletics
Under-20 athletics

References

External links
European Records U23 Men
European Records U23 Women

 
Age categories in athletics